Honey dill is a condiment consisting of honey, mayonnaise, and dried dill that is unique to Manitoba, Canada. It is often used as a dipping sauce for chicken fingers as well as for sweet potato fries. The sauce was mistakenly invented at Mitzi's Chicken Finger Restaurant in downtown Winnipeg. The restaurant specialized in chicken fingers, the meal for which the sauce is mostly used. Its owner tried to copy a different recipe by taste from another restaurant, but got the recipe wrong. The accidental sauce was so popular at the restaurant, that it took off locally in the province. President's Choice marketed a brand nationally, however, sales outside Manitoba were too slow. Today most production is done by a local Winnipeg producer or in-house at restaurants.

References

Canadian cuisine
Condiments
Food ingredients
Culture of Manitoba
Cuisine of Manitoba